It's Garry Shandling's Show is an American sitcom that originally aired on Showtime. It was created by Garry Shandling and Alan Zweibel. The series is notable for breaking the fourth wall. It premiered on September 10, 1986 and  ended on May 25, 1990, with a total of 72 episodes over the course of 4 seasons.

Series overview

Episodes

Season 1 (1986–87)

Season 2 (1987–88)

Season 3 (1988–89)

Season 4 (1989–90)

Notes

 A. 'Mac Brandes' is a pseudonym for Larry David.

References

External links 

It's Garry Shandling's Show